Caroline Walch (born 17 June 1961) is an English snooker player. She has won titles on the World Ladies Billiards and Snooker circuit and was runner-up in the 2000 World Women's Billiards Championship.

Career
Walch began her sporting career in 1983. In 1985, she won the Pontins (Brean Sands) Ladies tournament, was the losing finalist in the UK championship, and a semi-finalist in the world championship. She reached the world championship semi-finals again the following year.

At the 1991 Home Internationals tournament, Walch and Kim Shaw, representing England, won the women's competition. Walch won all her matches, and England finished top of the table ahead of Scotland on  difference. The other teams participating were Northern Ireland, the Republic of Ireland, Wales and the Isle of Man.

Walch, paired with Jimmy White, reached the 1991 World Masters Mixed Doubles final, but they lost 3–6 to Steve Davis and Allison Fisher.

In 2000, Walch was runner-up in the World Women's Billiards Championship, losing the final 50–218 to Emma Bonney.

Career Highlights
Snooker

Billiards

References

Living people
1961 births
English snooker players
Female snooker players
Female players of English billiards
English players of English billiards